This is a timeline documenting events of Jazz in the year 1944.

Events

1944 – The Metropolitan Opera House in New York City hosts a jazz concert for the first time. The performers are Louis Armstrong, Benny Goodman, Lionel Hampton, Artie Shaw, Roy Eldridge and Jack Teagarden.

Album releases
Coleman Hawkins - Rainbow Mist (1944)

Standards

Deaths

 February
 16 – Bob Zurke, American jazz pianist, arranger, composer and bandleader (born 1912).

 April
 19 – Jimmie Noone, American clarinetist (born 1895).

 March
 22 – Yank Porter, American pianist and composer (born 1895).

 July
 24 – O'Neill Spencer, American drummer and singer (born 1909).

 October
 22 – Clarence Profit, American pianist and composer (born 1912).

 December
 8 – Rod Cless, American clarinetist and saxophonist (born 1907).
 15 – Glenn Miller, American big-band musician, arranger, composer and bandleader (born 1904).
 19 – Miklós Vig, Hungarian singer, actor and comedian (born 1898).

 Unknown date
 Tommy Stevenson, American trumpet player (born 1914).

Births

January 
 5 – Louis Stewart, Irish guitarist (died 2016).
 6 – Don Sickler, American trumpeter.
 8 – Bobby Battle, American drummer.
 9 – Roy Hellvin, Norwegian pianist, composer, and music arranger.
 10
 Frank Sinatra Jr., American singer an orchestra leader (died 2016).
 Gianluigi Trovesi, Italian saxophonist, clarinetist, and composer.
 12 – Cynthia Robinson, American trumpeter and vocalist, Sly and the Family Stone (died 2015).
 20 – Chuck Domanico, American bassist (died 2002).
 23 – Randy Jones, British-born American drummer (died 2016).
 24 – Bob Degen, American pianist.
 29
 Salena Jones, American singer.
 Steve Reid, American drummer (died 2010).
 30 – Roger Humphries, American drummer.

February 
 1 – Ari Brown, American tenor saxophonist and pianist.
 5 – Bill Mays, American pianist.
 6 – Kosuke Mine, Japanese saxophonist.
 8 – Candy Johnson, American singer and dancer (died 2012).
 10 – Rufus Reid, American bassist, educator, and composer.
 11 – Martin Drew, English drummer (died 2010).
 15 – Henry Threadgill, American composer, saxophonist, and flautist.
 17 – Karl Jenkins, Welsh musician and composer.
 19 – Ron Mathewson, Scottish upright bassist and bass guitarist.
 20 – Lew Soloff, American trumpeter, composer, and actor (died 2015).
 22 – Mark Charig, British trumpeter and cornetist.
 24 – Oddbjørn Blindheim, Norwegian pianist.

March 
 6 – Kiri Te Kanawa, New Zealand soprano.
 10 – David Friedman, American percussionist.
 13 – Warren Tartaglia, American musician and poet (died 1965).
 15
 Jazz Summers, British music manager (lung cancer), Scissor Sisters, The Verve, and Snow Patrol (died 2015).
 Joachim Kühn, German pianist.
 Ralph MacDonald, Trinbagonian-American percussionist (died 2011).
 22 – Saheb Sarbib, American upright bassist and bandleader.
 26 – Diana Ross, American singer and actress.

April 
 5 – Evan Parker, British saxophonist.
 7
 Carol Grimes, British singer/songwriter poet and musician.
 Pat LaBarbera, American saxophonist, clarinetist, and flautist.
 16 – Sebastião Tapajós, Brazilian guitarist and composer.
 19 – Bernie Worrell, American keyboarder and composer, Parliament-Funkadelic (died 2016).
 20 – Iris Williams, Welsh singer.
 21 – Peter Kowald, German free jazz musician (died 2002).
 22 – Howard Wyeth, American drummer and pianist (died 1996).

May 
 16 – Billy Cobham, Panamanian-American drummer, composer, and bandleader.
 22 – Richard Dunbar, American player of the French horn (died 2006).
 30 – John Gross, American saxophone, flute and clarinet player.

June 
 4 – Jack Wilkins, American guitarist.
 6 – Monty Alexander, Jamaican-American pianist.
 7 – Erling Wicklund, Norwegian trombonist and music critique.
 8 – Babik Reinhardt, French guitarist (died 2001).
 10 – David Goloschekin, Russian violinist and multi-instrumentalist.
 17 – Chris Spedding, English guitarist, singer, songwriter, multi-instrumentalist, composer, and record producer.
 19 – Chico Buarque, Brazilian singer-songwriter, guitarist.
 21 – Jon Hiseman, English drummer, recording engineer, and record producer (died 2018).
 24
 Chris Wood, English saxophonist and flautist, Traffic (died 1983).
 Jeff Beck, English guitarist.
 25
 Bobby Naughton, American vibraphonist.
 Dave Cliff, British guitarist.
 26 – Arthur Doyle, American saxophonist, flutist, and vocalist (died 2014).

July 
 4
 Butch Miles, American drummer.
 Harvey Brooks, American bassist.
 Jan Erik Kongshaug, Norwegian guitarist, sound engineer, and composer.
 15 – Martha Brooks, Canadian writer and singer.
 17 – Aage Teigen, Norwegian trombonist (died 2014).
 19 – Didier Levallet, French upright bassist.
 21 – Orange Kellin, Swedish clarinetist.
 27 – Barbara Thompson, English saxophonist, and flautist.

August 
 2
 Albert Stinson, American upright bassist (died 1969).
 Naná Vasconcelos, Brazilian percussionist and vocalist (died 2016).
 4 – Bobo Stenson, Swedish pianist.
 5 – Phil Wachsmann, English violinist.
 8 – John Renbourn, English guitarist and songwriter (died 2015).
 18 – Oscar Brashear, American trumpeter.
 20 – Terry Clarke, Canadian drummer.
 25 – Pat Martino, American guitarist.
 30 – John Surman  English saxophone, bass clarinet, and pianist.

September 
 3 – Fred Hess, American tenor saxophonist (died 2018).
 9 – George Mraz, Czech-American bassist and alto saxophonist.
 18 – Michael Franks, American singer and songwriter.
 21 – John Clark, American hornist and composer.
 26 – Judy Chamberlain, American singer, bandleader and journalist.

October 
 4 – Eddie Gómez, Puerto Rican upright bassist.
 26 – Kenneth Ascher, American pianist, composer, and arranger.
 31 – Sherman Ferguson, American drummer (died 2006).

November 
 2 – Keith Emerson, English pianist and keyboardist (died 2016).
 4 – Willem Breuker, Dutch saxophonist (died 2010).
 8 – Charles Sullivan or Kamau Muata Adilifu, American trumpeter.
 13 – Kenny "Blues Boss" Wayne, American pianist, singer and songwriter.
 14 – George Cables, American pianist and composer.

December 
 12
 Alex Acuña, Peruvian drummer and percussionist.
 Michael Carvin, American drummer.
 15 – Carlos Inzillo, Argentinian clarinetist, producer, and historian.
 16 – John Abercrombie, American guitarist (died 2017).
 17 – Vyacheslav Ganelin, Lithuanian–Israeli musician and composer.
 19
 Alvin Lee, English singer and guitarist (died 2013).
 Steve Tyrell, American producer and vocalist.
 24 – Woody Shaw, trumpeter, flugelhornist, and cornetist (died 1989).
 31 – Bernie Senensky, Canadian pianist, organist, and composer.

Unknown date 
 Lars Edegran, American musician and bandleader.
 Tom Parker, British pianist (died 2013).
 Wally Shoup, American saxophonist and painter.

See also
 1940s in jazz
 List of years in jazz
 1944 in music

References

Bibliography

External links 
 History of Jazz Timeline: 1944 at All About Jazz

Jazz
Jazz by year